A visitor, in English and Welsh law and history, is an overseer of an autonomous ecclesiastical or eleemosynary institution, often a charitable institution set up for the perpetual distribution of the founder's alms and bounty, who can intervene in the internal affairs of that institution. Those with such visitors are mainly cathedrals, chapels, schools, colleges, universities, and hospitals.

Many visitors hold their role ex officio, by serving as the British sovereign, the Archbishop of Canterbury, the Lord Chancellor, the Lord President of the Council, the Lord Chief Justice, or the bishop of a particular diocese. Others can be appointed in various ways, depending on the constitution of the organization in question.  Bishops are usually the visitors to their own cathedrals. The King usually delegates his visitatorial functions to the Lord Chancellor.

During the reform of the universities of Oxford and Cambridge in the 19th century, Parliament ordered visitations to the universities to make inquiries and to reform the university and college statutes.

There is a ceremonial element to the role, and the visitor may also be called upon to give advice where an institution expresses doubt as to its powers under its charter and statutes. However, the most important function of the visitor was within academic institutions, where the visitor had to determine disputes arising between the institution and its members.

The right of the visitor, and not the courts, to adjudge on alleged deviations from the statutes of academic colleges was affirmed in the case of Philips v. Bury, 1694, in which the House of Lords overruled a judgment of the Court of King's Bench.

The Higher Education Act 2004 transferred the jurisdiction of visitors over the grievances of students in English and Welsh universities to the Office of the Independent Adjudicator.

Outside England and Wales
The position has also existed in universities in other countries which have followed the English and Welsh model (there being no such office in Scotland), although in many countries the visitor's role in complaints has been transferred to other bodies.

Ireland 
In Ireland, the Universities Act, 1997 redefines the appointment, function and responsibility of a visitor. Where a university does not have a visitor, a visitor may be appointed by the government and must be either a current or retired judge of the High Court or a retired judge of the Supreme Court.

Fiji 
In Fiji, the Court of Appeal in Muma v USP declared that in default of appointment, the country's president was the visitor of a university established by the Queen, since Fiji had subsequently become a republic.

Australia 
The Governor of Victoria is the visitor to all Victorian universities, but has only ceremonial duties.

The Governor of New South Wales is the visitor to Macquarie University, Sydney Grammar School, and the University of Sydney pursuant to statute. The governor is also the visitor of the University of Wollongong by the University of Wollongong Act 1989. Only ceremonial duties can be exercised by the Governor of NSW in his or her role as visitor; this is mandated under the same act.

Canada 
Prince Philip, Duke of Edinburgh, as a member of the Canadian Royal Family, served as the visitor to Upper Canada College from 1955 to his death in 2021.

The Governor General of Canada, as the King's representative in Canada, serves as the visitor to McGill University. Similarly, the Lieutenant Governor serves as the visitor to the University of Western Ontario in London, Ontario and the Lieutenant Governor of Newfoundland and Labrador serves as the visitor to Memorial University of Newfoundland.

The Anglican Bishop of Montreal serves as the visitor to Bishop's University in Lennoxville, Quebec and the Anglican Bishop of Huron serves as the visitor to Renison University College in Waterloo, Ontario. The Catholic Bishop of Saint John serves, as founding member of St. Thomas University's board of governors in Fredericton, New Brunswick.

India 
In India, the President of India is the visitor to 126 central government institutes, such as the Indian Institutes of Technology.

United States 
In the United States, the office of visitor, from its early use at some colleges and other institutions, evolved specifically into that of a trustee. Certain colleges and universities, particularly of an earlier, often colonial founding, are governed by boards of visitors, often chaired by a rector (rather than regents or trustees, etc.). Examples include the College of William and Mary and the University of Virginia.

Nigeria 
In Nigeria, the visitor in publicly funded tertiary institution is the most senior member of government. This is usually the president in federally-funded universities or the governor for state-funded universities.

In literature
In the Jill Paton Walsh continuation of the Lord Peter Wimsey series of detective novels, The Late Scholar, Lord Peter (now the Duke of Denver) is the visitor of the fictional St Severin's College in Oxford, which is central to the plot.

See also
Apostolic visitor
Provincial episcopal visitor
List of college visitors of the University of Oxford
List of college visitors of the University of Cambridge

References

External links
Privy Council – visitatorial powers
Reforming the Office of Lord Chancellor – visitatorial powers
An Example University School Board of Visitors at NJIT SOM

Ecclesiastical titles
English legal professionals
Welsh legal professionals
Ceremonial officers in England
Ceremonial officers in Wales